Carrier Strike Group 3 (CSG-3 or CARSTRKGRU 3) is a U.S. Navy carrier strike group. Carrier strike groups gain and maintain sea control as well as project naval airpower ashore. The aircraft carrier  is the group's current flagship.

Between 2005 and 2013, the group made five deployments to the U.S. Fifth Fleet supporting U.S. ground forces in Iraq, and Afghanistan.  On 18 December 2011, strike group aircraft flew the final carrier-based air mission over Iraq, effectively ending U.S. naval support for Operation New Dawn.

Historical background

Carrier Division Three
The aircraft carrier  was assigned to Carrier Division Three from November 1940. In April 1941, a Central Atlantic Neutrality Patrol was established under Admiral A.B. Cook, based at Bermuda. On 7 December 1941, in the Atlantic Fleet, Carrier Division Three comprised Wasp and  under Rear Admiral A.B. Cook. Commander Carrier Division Three served as Commander Task Force 77 during the Korean War.

Carrier Group Three
On 30 June 1973, Carrier Division 3 was redesignated Carrier Group 3. U.S. Navy carrier battle groups have, since the mid-Cold War period, maintained a pattern of deployments to trouble spots, beginning with an overhaul, individual ship training, battle group training, group preparation exercise, and then the deployment. On returning home, the cycle begins once more. As part of these deployments, the Carl Vinson carrier battle group participated in Exercise RIMPAC '84, RIMPAC '86, RIMPAC '98, PACEX '89, Exercise Rugged Nautilus, Operation Southern Watch, Operation Desert Strike, Operation Desert Fox, and Operation Iraqi Freedom. From 1989 to 1991, USS Carl Vinson served as the flagship for Carrier Group 3. During this period, Carrier Group 3 was one of three battle groups that took part in PACEX '89.

In August 1990, Commander, U.S. Seventh Fleet was deployed to Bahrain in order to serve as Commander, U.S. Naval Forces Central Command (ComUSNAVCENT) following the Iraqi invasion of Kuwait. Since ComUSNAVCENT operated from on board ship, he established NAVCENT-Riyadh as a staff organization to provide continuous Navy representation at United States Central Command headquarters. This mission was assigned initially to Commander, Carrier Group Three. During succeeding months, the NAVCENT-Riyadh staff was augmented substantially but remained small, relative to the United States Army Central and CENTAF staffs. In November, the NAVCENT-Riyadh command was transferred from COMCARGRU 3 to Commander, Cruiser-Destroyer Group 5. This change resulted in the Navy flag officer at NAVCENT Riyadh's remaining relatively junior to other Service representatives, particularly the Air Force.

In the middle of 1992, the U.S. Navy made some organizational changes. Each of the Navy's twelve carrier battle groups was planned to consist of an aircraft carrier; an embarked carrier air wing; cruiser, destroyer, and frigate units; and two nuclear-powered attack submarines. The chart below shows the ships and aircraft of the group after the reorganization.

Carrier Group Three, late 1992

From June 1993, Commander Carrier Group 3 had his flag aboard Abraham Lincoln. In 1993, the battle group provided support to the multinational military forces assigned to Operation Restore Hope in Somalia, and the group subsequently made three Western Pacific/Persian Gulf deployments for Operation Southern Watch and Operation Vigilant Sentinel. On 13 May 1997 Carrier Air Wing Eleven was reassigned to Commander, Carrier Group 3 and the USS Carl Vinson.

Carrier Group 3 formed the core of the naval power during the initial phase of Operation Enduring Freedom in 2001.  At the time the group comprised , Destroyer Squadron 9 and Carrier Air Wing Eleven. Commander, Carrier Group 3, Rear Admiral Thomas E. Zelibor, arrived in the Arabian Sea on 12 September 2001 and was subsequently designated Commander Task Force 50 (CTF 50), commanding multiple carrier task groups and coalition forces.  The Task Force conducted strikes against Al Quida and Taliban forces in Afghanistan. Task Force 50 comprised over 59 ships from six nations including six aircraft carriers, stretching over 800 nautical miles.

Rear Admiral Evan M. Chanik was the last commander of Carrier Group 3. During his tenure, Admiral Chanik led the group through a reorganized Inter-Deployment Training Cycle which greatly compressed the training required for overseas deployment. On 1 October 2004, Carrier Group Three was redesignated as Carrier Strike Group Three.

Command structure
The strike group commander is responsible for unit-level training, integrated training, and material readiness for the group's ships and aviation squadrons. When it is not deployed, the group reports to Commander, U.S. Third Fleet which directs the group's pre-deployment training and certifications including its Composite Training Unit Exercises. When deployed beyond U.S. coastal waters, the group comes under the command of the numbered fleet commander in the area in which it is operating – either Third, Fourth, Fifth, Sixth, or Seventh Fleets.  When deployed in this fashion, the group utilizes a task force or task group designator, for example, Task Group 50.1 in the Fifth Fleet area.

Group commanders since 2004 have included:

Operational history

2005 deployment
On 17 January 2005, Carl Vinson departed Bremerton, Washington, with Carrier Air Wing Nine embarked for a six-month deployment, which included several months in the Persian Gulf supporting U.S. forces fighting the War in Iraq. On 30 January 2005, the group departed San Diego following the completion of its 22-day pre-deployment Joint Task Force Exercise.

In total, the group launched more than 6,500 sorties, totaling more than 20,000 flight hours, in support of Multi-National Force - Iraq troops and various maritime interdiction operations, including 2,600 flight hours logged by its four F/A-18 strike-fighter squadrons. Destroyer Squadron 31 conducted more than 80 boardings in conjunction with British, Italian, Australian, Canadian and regional forces.

On 11 June 2005,  rendered assistance in response to a distress call from the Iranian fishing dhow Henif.  A boat transported an ill Iranian fisherman to Mustin, where he was subsequently transferred to Vinson by helicopter.  Once aboard Vinson, the fisherman was taken to the ship's infirmary where he underwent tests.  The fisherman was apparently suffering from a severe allergic reaction.  He was treated, and after a short recovery period, he was returned to the Henif via one of the carrier's boats.

The group completed its 2005 deployment at Naval Station Norfolk on 31 July 2005. Vinson then began a scheduled 36-month Refueling and Complex Overhaul, prior to becoming flagship for Carrier Strike Group One. The new group flagship, changed its homeport to Bremerton in January 2005, and once there, underwent an 11-month overhaul. Reflecting the reduced responsibilities while the ships were undergoing overhauls, Rear Admiral Clingan was succeeded by Captain Scott A. Berg in September 2005 as carrier strike group commander. Rear Admiral Kevin M. Quinn subsequently relieved Captain Berg in November 2005.
2005 deployment force composition

2007 deployment

Stennis departed from its homeport in Bremerton, Washington, on 16 January 2007, spent one day in port on-loading Carrier Air Wing Nine onto the carrier, and the strike group departed San Diego on 20 January 2006 for its 2007 deployment.

During its 2007 deployment, Carrier Air Wing Nine flew more than 7,900 sorties providing more than 22,000 flight hours and dropping nearly 90,000 pounds of ordnance in support of the International Security Assistance Force operating on the ground in Afghanistan and Iraq.

On 23 May 2007, Stennis, along with eight other warships including the aircraft carrier  and amphibious assault ship , passed through the Strait of Hormuz into the Persian Gulf (pictured).  US Navy officials said it was the largest such move of warships since 2003. The group subsequently participated in Expeditionary Strike Force (ESF) training while simultaneously providing close-air support to coalition ground forces in Iraq and Afghanistan.  The ESF training brought together Carrier Strike Group 3, Carrier Strike Group 11 led by Nimitz, and Bonhomme Richard Expeditionary Strike Group to test their ability to plan and conduct multi-task force operations across a broad spectrum of naval disciplines.

Thereafter, the group participated in Exercise Valiant Shield off the coast of Guam between 7–14 August 2007. Valiant Shield 2007 tested the military's ability to rapidly bring together joint forces in response to any regional contingency. Valiant Shield was the last operational portion of the group's 2007 deployment.

The group entered Pearl Harbor on 20 August 2007. The strike group returned to San Diego on 27 August 2007, and the carrier John C. Stennis returned to its homeport on 31 August 2007.
2007 deployment force composition

2007 deployment exercises and port visits

2009 deployment

John C. Stennis departed Bremerton on 13 January 2009, and the group departed Naval Air Station North Island on 17 January 2009 after embarking Carrier Air Wing Nine. Carrier Air Wing Nine flew more than 7250 sorties, consisting of approximately 12,747 flight hours with a sortie completion rate of 97 percent during its 2009 deployment.

Helicopter Maritime Strike Squadron 71 (HSM-71), a new component to Carrier Air Wing Nine, was the first squadron of its kind to embark on board a carrier as part of a carrier air wing  (pictured). The squadron flew more than 4,690 hours with a 95 percent sortie completion rate and earned the right to fly the Enlisted Aviation Warfare Pennant.  The highlight for the squadron occurred during the undersea warfare exercise when HSM-71 deployed multiple aircraft to practice engagements on U.S. and Japanese submarines.  The squadron kept three helicopters aloft throughout the entire four-day exercise for a total of 222 flight hours and conducted 28 simulated attacks on two U.S. and two Japanese submarines.

The strike group participated in Exercise Key Resolve/Foal Eagle which began on 28 February 2009. Key Resolve/Foal Eagle was held in the aftermath of the sinking of the ROK corvette Cheonan and the shelling of Yeonpyeong Island by North Korea. During the exercise, the aircraft carrier Stennis was overflown by two Russian Ilyushin Il-38 maritime patrol aircraft on 16 March and two Tupolev Tu-95 long-range bombers on 17 March.  Both time the Russian aircraft were intercepted and escorted by F/A-18 Hornets until the Russian aircraft left the exercise area.

The strike group then split. Both Kidd and Preble returned to port on 16 June 2009. John C. Stennis and Antietam sailed north to the Gulf of Alaska to participate in Operation Northern Edge, held between 15–26 June 2009. Stennis returned to port on 10 July 2009.

2009 deployment force composition

2009 deployment exercises and port visits

2011–2012 deployment

On 25 July 2011, the aircraft carrier John C. Stennis departed from its homeport of Naval Base Kitsap-Bremerton, Washington.  Stennis was subsequently joined by Carrier Air Wing Nine, Destroyer Squadron Twenty-one, and the guided-missile cruiser Mobile Bay. On 29 July 2011, the strike group departed from Naval Air Station San Diego near San Diego, California, for its 2011–2012 deployment.

The first port-of-call for the group was to have been Manila, Philippines, but that port-call was cancelled because of Typhoon Mina. On 13 October 2011, the guided-missile destroyer  was directed to join Carrier Strike Group 5 to provide disaster relief to flood-ravaged Thailand.

During the deployment, the strike group and Carrier Air Wing Nine launched a combined total of 13,389 sorties in support of Operation New Dawn and Operation Enduring Freedom – Afghanistan. On 18 December 2011, the strike group's aircraft flew the final carrier-based air sortie over Iraq, effectively ending U.S. naval support for Operation New Dawn.  The final command-and-control mission for U.S. forces over Iraq was flown by an E-2C Hawkeye (pictured) from Airborne Early Warning Squadron 112, catapulting off the carrier Stennis at 7:32 am and returning at 11:04 a.m, both local time.

While operating with Combined Task Force 151, on 13 December 2011, the destroyer  disrupted a group of suspected pirates south of Yemen near the Internationally Recommended Transit Corridor.  At approximately 8:40 am local time, the merchant vessel M/V Nordic Apollo reported to United Kingdom Maritime Trade Operations, Dubai, of being fired upon by pirates in a skiff. At approximately 11:00 am, the M/V Heather, operating 30 nautical miles from Nordic Apollo, reported suspicious activity by a skiff.  CTF-151 commander Rear Admiral Kaleem Shaukat, Pakistan Navy, ordered Pinckney to investigate. Pinckney got underway and launched its MH-60R helicopter which located a suspicious skiff.  Once under observation, the helicopter reported that the skiff had nine suspected pirates aboard, as well as several ladders, weapons and fuel containers that the suspected pirates attempted to cover up or throw overboard.  As Pinckney closed, the skiff stopped and the suspected pirates threw their weapons overboard, which were identified as five AK-47 rifles, one rocket propelled grenade (RPG) launcher. and three RPG rounds.  Pinckney conduct a boarding using their visit, board, search and seizure (VBSS) team (pictured), and once aboard, the VBSS team confirmed that there were nine suspected pirates, one grappling hook, 36 barrels of fuel, and 75 and 45 horsepower outboard engines. The VBSS team scuttled one outboard motor and left the skiff with enough fuel and water to return to shore.

On 5 January 2012, at approximately 12:30 p.m local time, an SH-60S Seahawk helicopter from guided-missile destroyer  detected a suspected pirate skiff alongside the Iranian-flagged fishing dhow Al Molai operating in the northern Arabian Sea. Simultaneously, the Kidd received a distress call was from the master of the Al Molai claiming to be held captive by pirates. The Kidd dispatched a visit, board, search and seizure team that boarded the Al Molai (pictured) and subsequently detained 15 suspected pirates who had been holding a 13-member Iranian crew hostage for several weeks.  The pirates did not resist the boarding, quickly surrendered, and were detained on the Al Molai by the Kidd boarding party until the next morning, 6 January 2012, when they were transferred to the aircraft carrier John C. Stennis where the incident was reviewed for potential prosecution. According to the Iranian vessel's crew, the Al Molai had been pirated and used as a "mother ship" for pirate operations throughout the Persian Gulf during the preceding 40–45 days.  The pirates forced the Al Molai crew to live in harsh conditions under the constant threat of violence with limited supplies and medical aid.  The Kidd VSBB team provided the Al Molai crew with food, water, and medical care, and the Al Molai master thanked the VBSS team for their assistance.

On 18 January 2012, at 7:53 am local time, an MH-60R Seahawk helicopter from the squadron HSM-71 spotted the Iranian fishing vessel Al Mamsoor disabled in the Arabian Sea.  The vessel was in a sinking condition, and the helicopter alerted the guided-missile destroyer  which rendered assistance.  Dewey dispatched a visit, board, search and seizure (VBSS) team (pictured) which discovered that the Al Mamsoor was in a sinking condition for the previous three days.  The VBSS team provided food, water, medical, and hygienic supplies to the Iranian mariners, and after confirming Iranian nationals' safety, departed the scene.

On 27 December 2011, Stennis concluded a four-day port visit to Jebel Ali in the United Arab Emirates. It then steamed through the Strait of Hormuz to the North Arabian Sea to provide combat air support to coalition ground forces in Afghanistan. On 3 January 2012, following the end of Velayat 90, a 10-day Iranian military exercise in international waters near the Strait of Hormuz, the Iranian Army chief of staff, General Ataollah Salehi, warned the United States to not send the Stennis back into the Persian Gulf.  This initiated the 2011–12 Strait of Hormuz dispute between the United States and Iran over access through the strait.

On 27 February 2012, the strike group completed its seven-month deployment. The cruiser Mobile Bay and destroyers Pinckney, Kidd, Dewey, and Wayne E. Meyer returned to Naval Base San Diego.  Stennis stopped in San Diego before returning to its homeport of Naval Base Kitsap, Washington, on 28 February 2012.
2011–2012 deployment force composition

2011–2012 deployment exercises and port visits

2012–2013 deployment

Between 29 June and 17 July 2012, Stennis conducted Fleet Replacement Squadron Carrier Qualifications and Sustainment Exercises off the coast of southern California.  On 27 August 2012, four months ahead of schedule, the group departed for an eight-month U.S. Fifth Fleet deployment under the command of Rear Admiral Charles M. Gaouette. On 30 August 2012, Stennis arrived at Naval Air Station North Island, California, to embark Carrier Air Wing Nine, departing on 1 September 2012 with the guided-missile cruiser Mobile Bay. On 31 August 2012, the carrier Stennis embarked additional Carrier Air Wing Nine personnel during a port visit to Pearl Harbor, Hawaii, departing on 1 September 2012, with the guided-missile Paul Hamilton joining the strike group.

On 11 September 2012, the group came under U.S. Seventh Fleet command and soon began taking part in Exercise Valiant Shield 2012 off Guam (pictured). The deployment of two carrier strike groups for this exercise coincided with the ongoing Senkaku Islands dispute between China and Japan. After four weeks underway, the first port call of the deployment followed at Kota Kinabalu, Malaysia, the first such visit by a U.S. aircraft carrier to that port. Following its port visit to Phuket, Thailand, the group participated in joint operations with Carrier Strike Group 5 in the Andaman Sea (pictured).

On 17 October 2012, the strike group entered the Fifth Fleet area, joining Carrier Strike Group 8 in support of Operation Enduring Freedom in Afghanistan, maritime security operations, and theater security cooperation missions. On 21 October 2012, Carrier Air Wing Nine began strikes supporting the International Security Assistance Force in Afghanistan. On 22 March 2013, the group concluded air operations over Afghanistan, with its aircraft having flown around 1,200 sorties totaling over 7,400 flight hours.

On 27 October 2012, Fifth Fleet commander Vice Admiral John W. Miller ordered the temporary reassignment of Rear Admiral Gaouette pending the results of an investigation by the Naval Inspector General.  Gaouette's chief of staff, Captain William C. Minter, led the strike group until the arrival of Rear Admiral Troy Shoemaker as Gaouette's replacement. Later it emerged that Gaouette was dismissed for misconduct including '..for misconduct including foul language, flipping off lieutenants, speculation that black admirals were chosen because of their race and sending fellow officers a racially charged email about a black sailor.'

On 6 February 2013, the U.S. Department of Defense announced that the upcoming deployment of the carrier  and the cruiser  would be postponed pending the resolution of the upcoming budget sequestration, leaving Carrier Strike Group 3 as the only U.S. carrier force operating in the Persian Gulf region.

In an March 2013 interview, group commander Rear Admiral Troy Shoemaker noted that the shortfall of U.S. escort ships was being off-set by the assignment of the British destroyer  and the French frigate [[French frigate Chevalier Paul (D621)|Chevalier Paul]], to operate with the strike group. In that capacity, on 2 March 2013, the Farragut joined the guided-missile frigate  is aiding distressed mariners aboard a dhow in the Gulf of Aden. Both Farragut and Churchill left the U.S. Fifth Fleet via the Suez Canal on 8 March 2013. On 1 March 2013, the destroyer  from Carrier Strike Group Eleven entered the Persian Gulf for operations with the strike group.

On 26 March 2013, the strike group departed the Fifth Fleet.  During over five months of operations, Carrier Air Wing Nine had flown a total of more than 9,000 sorties and more than 23,000 flight hours in support of coalition forces in Afghanistan. Also on that date, the carrier Stennis and Carrier Air Wing Nine received the 2012 Ramage Award for carrier/air wing operational excellence during the 2012–2013 deployment.

On 29 April 2013, the carrier Vinson and the cruiser Mobile Bay arrived at Naval Station San Diego, California, ending the 2013 deployment.

2012–2013 deployment force composition

2012–2013 deployment exercises and port visits

2013–2015 operations & upkeep

On 27 June 2013, the carrier John C. Stennis began a scheduled 14-month-long overhaul when it entered drydock at the Puget Sound Naval Shipyard and Intermediate Maintenance Facility at Bremerton, Washington (pictured). On 19 August 2013, the destroyer Milius completed its Extended Drydocking Selected Restricted Availability (E-DSRA) overhaul. On 23 September 2013, the destroyer Wayne E. Meyer completed its Mid-Cycle Inspection (MCI) assessment with the Board of Inspection and Survey.

Between 7–11 October 2013, the cruiser Mobile Bay and destroyer Dewey participated with other U.S. and Canadian warships in a Task Group Exercise (TGEX) maneuvers. Following this exercise, the Mobile Bay began its Selected Restricted Availability (SRA) overhaul at the BAE Systems ship repair facility in San Diego, California, with a completion date of May 2014.

In November 2013, the destroyer Kidd completed its two-week Independent Deployer Certification (IDCERT) exercises. Also, during that month, the Wayne E. Meyer underwent its own IDCERT exercises in the southern California operating area, as well as participating Group Sail maneuvers with Carrier Strike Group Nine, as part of Wayne E. Meyers work-up for its upcoming 2014 deployment.

On 25 April 2014, John C. Stennis departed drydock, completing its 14-month-long overhaul (pictured). Between 23–28 September 2014, strike group planners held a pre-deployment training planning meeting among the various component commands. It was held at Naval Base Kitsap-Bangor, Washington. Both Stennis and Carrier Air Wing 9 completed their flight deck certification on 11 December 2014. During 13–15 January 2015, Stennis on-loaded over six million pounds  of munitions at the U.S. Naval Magazine Indian Island, Washington.

On 23 March 2015, John C. Stennis departed Naval Base Kitsap, Washington, for a Tailored Ship's Training Availability (TSTA) and Final Evaluation Period (FEP) exercises in the Southern California operating area (pictured) after a six-week Continuous Maintenance Availability (CMAV). The Stennis subsequently conducted joint training exercise with the U.S. Army helicopters, stationed at Joint Base Lewis-McChord, Washington, while transiting the Strait of Juan de Fuca.  On 8 June 2015, the Stennis departed Bremerton, Washington, for Carrier Qualifications (CQ) exercises before paying a port call at Naval Air Station North Island, California, from 12–15 June 2015. The Stennis completed its Composite Training Unit Exercise (COMPTUEX) and Joint Task Force Exercise (JTFEX) training before returning to its home-base on 1 September 2015.

 2016 deployment 
On 15 January 2016, John C. Stennis'' left Naval Base Kitsap for a scheduled deployment to the Western Pacific. The biofuel mix was 10% biofuel and 90% petroleum. However, the 50-50 goal is still on track, Navy Secretary Ray Mabus told Navy Times in September 2015. The strike group was planned to make a seven-month deployment within the Seventh Fleet area of responsibility.

Notes
Footnotes

Citations

Sources
 
 
 
 
 

Carrier Strike Groups
Military units and formations established in 2004
Military units and formations in Washington (state)